Aslam is a male given name and surname used in the Muslim world. It is also a surname of English origin, and has two possible sources, the first being from a topographical name for someone who lived by the hazels, derived from the Old English pre 7th century "hoeslum", from "hoesel", hazel.

It may refer to:

 Aslam Pahalwan (born 1927), Pakistani professional wrestler
 Sheikh Mohammad Aslam, Bangladeshi footballer 
 Dilpazier Aslam (born 1978), English journalist
 Mohammad Aslam Khan Khalil (born 1950), American scientist

Arabic-language surnames